William Sawyer (c. 3 December 1712 – c. 2 April 1761) was an English cricketer who played during the 1730s and 1740s.  He was mainly associated with Richmond and Surrey.  Although information about his career is limited by a lack of surviving data, he is known to have made two single wicket and four other appearances between 1736 and 1747. He spent his whole life in Richmond and was an innkeeper there.

Cricket career
In June 1736, there was a major single wicket match on Kennington Common and the report names Wakeland and George Oldner of London Cricket Club playing together against two "famous" Richmond players who are "esteemed the best two in England". Unfortunately the esteemed pair are not named, though one of them suffered serious facial injuries in this game when the ball came off his bat and hit his nose. The report rails against "human brutes" who insisted he should play on despite his injuries, the money they had staked being of much greater importance to them.  It is believed that one of the Richmond players was William Sawyer, who was certainly active in the 1730s and who, in 1743, was acclaimed by name as "one of the best six players in England".

Sawyer is first definitely mentioned in a contemporary report of a celebrated single wicket "threes" game played at the Artillery Ground on 11 July 1743.  The Daily Advertiser declared that the six players involved were the "best in England".  They were William Hodsoll (Dartford), Val Romney (Sevenoaks) and John Cutbush (Maidstone) (replacing Ridgeway of Sussex) who played as Three of Kent; and Richard Newland (Slindon), John Bryant (Bromley) and Sawyer, who played as Three of All-England.  Kent won by 2 runs.  The London Evening Post says the crowd was computed to be 10,000.  A return match was arranged at Sevenoaks Vine on Wed 27 July but it did not come off.

On 25 July 1743, Sawyer played as a given man for London against Addington at the 
Artillery Ground, but Addington won by an innings and 4 runs having scored 110 while London could only manage 32 and 74.

In 1744, Sawyer played in both of the matches from which scorecards have survived.  When London met Slindon at the Artillery Ground on 2 June, Sawyer was in the London team, possibly batting third, and scored 4 in each innings as Slindon won by 55 runs.  On 18 June, he was a given man in the Kent team that played All-England at the Artillery Ground, scoring 0 and 5 as Kent won a low-scoring game by 1 wicket.

Sawyer's last known appearance was on 31 August 1747, when he played in a first-class match for All-England v Kent at the Artillery Ground. The result is unknown but the match had been postponed earlier in the season because of a parliamentary election.

References

Bibliography
 F S Ashley-Cooper, At the Sign of the Wicket: Cricket 1742–1751, Cricket Magazine, 1900
 Arthur Haygarth, Scores & Biographies, Volume 1 (1744–1826), Lillywhite, 1862
 Timothy J McCann, Sussex Cricket in the Eighteenth Century, Sussex Record Society, 2004
 H T Waghorn, Cricket Scores, Notes, etc. (1730–1773), Blackwood, 1899

1712 births
1761 deaths
English cricketers
English cricketers of 1701 to 1786
Surrey cricketers
Non-international England cricketers